Xinning is the atonal pinyin romanization of various Chinese words and names, particularly Xīnníng (Chinese:t, s, "Newly Pacified").

It may refer to:

 Xinning County, Hunan, administered as part of Shaoyang Prefecture
 Xinning County, Guangdong, the former name of Taishan
 Xinning Railway, the modernized spelling of the Sun Ning Railway, which connected Taishan to its port and hinterland in the early 20th century
 Xinning, Gansu, a town in Ning County
 Xinning, Guangxi, a town in Fusui County
 Xinning, Jiangxi, a town in Wuning County